Sefid Khani (also Romanized as Sefīd Khānī) is a village in Itivand-e Jonubi Rural District, Kakavand District, Delfan County, Lorestan Province, Iran. At the 2006 census, its population was 338, in 58 families.

References 

Towns and villages in Delfan County